is a Japanese politician of the Komeito Party, a member of the House of Councillors in the Diet (national legislature). A native of Osaka, Osaka and graduate of Keio University, he was elected for the first time in 2004. Nishida is head of the Komeito's tax panel.

References

External links 
 Official website in Japanese.

1962 births
Living people
Keio University alumni
Members of the House of Councillors (Japan)
New Komeito politicians